Rémy Di Gregorio (born 31 July 1985) is a French road bicycle racer, who is currently suspended from the sport following a positive in-competition doping test for darbepoetin alfa, a re-engineered form of erythropoietin (EPO).

Career
He rode his first Tour de France in 2007. He broke his elbow in a crash on the fourth stage. He finished the stage 7:58 behind the leader and left the race. He broke clear on the 10th stage of the 2008 Tour de France edition, on Bastille Day, and led until the  final climb.

Doping
On 10 July 2012, the first rest day of the 2012 Tour de France, Remi di Gregorio was arrested by French police on suspicion of doping. In April 2013, it was revealed that Di Gregorio could resume his career, since the products found in his possession at the Tour turned out to be vitamins. Prosecutors said the case was not formally closed. Di Gregorio maintained he has never doped and successfully sued  for unfair dismissal.

In April 2018, news broke that Di Gregorio had failed an in-competition doping test for darbepoetin alfa, a re-engineered form of erythropoietin (EPO), during that year's Paris–Nice. He was suspended for 4 years, backdated from the adverse finding, following the confirmation that his B-sample also tested positive in May 2020.

Major results

2003
 1st  Time trial, National Junior Road Championships
2004
 3rd Overall Ronde de l'Isard
 5th Paris–Mantes-en-Yvelines
2005
 5th Overall Tour de l'Ain
2006
 1st Stage 8 Tour de l'Avenir
2007
 1st  Mountains classification Critérium du Dauphiné Libéré
2008
 10th Overall Tour Méditerranéen
  Combativity award Stage 10 Tour de France
2009
 5th Overall Route du Sud
 6th Overall Tour de l'Ain
2010
 5th Grand Prix d'Ouverture La Marseillaise
 10th Overall Volta a Catalunya
2011
 1st Stage 7 Paris–Nice
2012
 3rd Overall Vuelta a Asturias
1st Stage 3
 3rd Overall Vuelta a la Comunidad de Madrid
2013
 1st  Overall Tour of Bulgaria
1st Stage 2
2014
 1st  Overall Tour de Taiwan
 2nd Boucles de l'Aulne
 5th Overall Tour du Limousin
 5th Classic Sud-Ardèche
 5th Grand Prix de Plumelec-Morbihan
 6th Overall Tour de l'Ain
 9th Overall Tour Alsace
1st  Mountains classification
 9th Overall Tour d'Azerbaïdjan
 9th Overall Tour du Gévaudan Languedoc-Roussillon
 9th Tour du Jura
2016
 1st  Mountains classification Tour La Provence
 1st  Mountains classification Critérium International
2017
 2nd Overall Tour of Almaty
2018
 1st  Mountains classification Étoile de Bessèges
 1st Stage 2 Tour La Provence
 6th Grand Prix d'Ouverture La Marseillaise

References

External links

Rémy Di Gregorio profile at Astana

1985 births
Living people
French male cyclists
French people of Italian descent
Cyclists from Marseille